The 2009 Ekiti State gubernatorial election was held on 25 April 2009. It was, however, not until 5 May 2009, that the exercise was concluded due to electoral violence. Incumbent PDP Governor Segun Oni won re-election in the supplementary election, defeating AC Kayode Fayemi candidate to emerge winner.

Segun Oni emerged winner in the PDP gubernatorial primary election. His running mate was Sikiru Tae Lawal.

Electoral system
The Governor of Ekiti State is elected using the plurality voting system.

Results
The two main contenders registered with the Independent National Electoral Commission to contest in the re-run election were PDP Governor Segun Oni, who won the contest, and ACN's Kayode Fayemi, who follows closely. The election results were later legally contested by the Fayemi in the court.

References 

Ekiti State gubernatorial elections
Ekiti State gubernatorial election
April 2009 events in Nigeria